Alexander "Alex" Naddour (born March 4, 1991) is a former American artistic gymnast. He was part of the bronze medal team at the 2011 World Artistic Gymnastics Championships. Naddour was an alternate for Team USA at the 2012 Summer Olympics in London. He also won a bronze medal on the pommel horse individual event competition at the 2016 Summer Olympics in Rio de Janeiro. He announced his retirement from gymnastics on March 26, 2021, via Instagram.

Personal life
Naddour was born on March 4, 1991, to Mike and Sandy Naddour in Gilbert, Arizona.

In 2015, Naddour married fellow gymnast Hollie Vise. The couple have a daughter, Lilah, born in February 2016, and a son, Crew, born in June 2018.

Gymnastics career
Naddour was a member of the U.S. men's national team for the 2011, 2013, 2014, 2015, and 2017 World Championships. Pommel horse is considered his strongest event. He is a five-time national champion, three-time World finalist and Olympic bronze medalist in pommel horse.

On June 20, 2018, Alex Naddour was suspended by USA Gymnastics following allegations of sexual misconduct. The USA Gymnastics officials were presented with the first allegations in 2012. Additional allegations were made against Naddour around 2016. Naddour tweeted in response: "I have no idea what is happening or why, we are trying to contact safe sport for any information." Naddour was cleared of a sexual misconduct allegation by the United States Center for SafeSport and removed from the USA Gymnastics suspended list in November 2018.

Olympics
On June 25, 2016, Naddour was named to the 2016 U.S. men's gymnastic's team for the 2016 Summer Olympics in Rio. Naddour had been named as an alternate for the U.S. in 2012. On August 14, 2016, Naddour won a bronze medal in the pommel horse at the Rio Olympics, the first medal of that Olympiad for the U.S. male gymnasts and the first pommel horse medal for Team USA since Peter Vidmar and Tim Daggett in 1984.

References

External links
 
 
 

1991 births
Living people
People from Gilbert, Arizona
Sportspeople from the Phoenix metropolitan area
American male artistic gymnasts
Oklahoma Sooners men's gymnasts
Medalists at the World Artistic Gymnastics Championships
Gymnasts at the 2016 Summer Olympics
Medalists at the 2016 Summer Olympics
Olympic bronze medalists for the United States in gymnastics
20th-century American people
21st-century American people